Oscar Wang (born Wang Zhengxiong; July 7, 1998) also known as Oscar (Chinese:奥斯卡) or Oscar Wang, is a Chinese singer and dancer. Born in Brazil and a native of Chengdu, Sichuan province. He was trained at Cube Entertainment in Korea for three years. In 2020 and 2021, he participated under the name Oscar in the Youku idol group casting show  "We Are Young" (Chinese:少年之名) and in the Tencent Video idol group casting show "Chuang 2021" (Chinese: 创造营2021) and gained popularity. In August 2022 he signed with Ryce Entertainment and gave himself the new stage name OZ.

Career 
In June 2020, he participated in the Youku idol group casting show "We Are Young", and successfully advanced to the finals in August, ranking 19th.

In January 2021, he participated in the Tencent Video International idol group casting show "Chuang 2021", and also successfully advanced to the finals, and finally ranked 13th, but failed to form a group.

On January 11, 2022, he released his first Mini Album "ME, MYSELF & I".

In August 2022 he signed with Ryce Entertainment and gave himself the new stage name OZ.

In January 2023, he released album "FEELINGS".

《We Are Young》

《Chuang 2021》 

 Entering debut group rankings are in bold.

Discography

Albums

Singles

《Chuang 2021》Performances

Television shows

Other ventures

Endorsements

Magazine

Events

References

External links 

 OZ on Sina Weibo (in Chinese)
 OZ on Instagram

Living people
21st-century Chinese male singers
1998 births